Wang Fu may refer to:

Wang Fu (Han dynasty) (78–163), Han Dynasty philosopher
Wang Fu (eunuch) (died 179), influential palace eunuch under Emperor Ling
Wang Fu (Three Kingdoms) (died 222), official of Shu Han during the Three Kingdoms period
 Wang Fu (or Fou) :zh:王浮, daoist of the early Jin dynasty, author of the Huahujing.
Wang Fu (painter) (1362–1416), Ming Dynasty painter